Saniya Anklesaria is an actress who appears in Hindi films, commercials and TV shows. She is known for her role of Max in the Disney Channel India sitcom, The Suite Life of Karan & Kabir, an Indian adaptation of the American show The Suite Life of Zack & Cody and Guri Malhotra, a recurring character on the Disney hit series Best of Luck Nikki, an Indian adaptation of the American show Good Luck Charlie. She also appeared in mainstream Bollywood movies, like Rowdy Rathore, Raanjhanaa, Life's Good and  Bombairiya.

Life

Saniya Anklesaria first acted at the age of seven in Raell Padamsee's seven-day acting workshop during her summer vacation of 2009. Upon completion she was selected for a television commercial in her first audition. Since then she has featured in several television commercials and print media nationwide. She started dance at the age of four and then started taking dancing classes at the Shiamak Davar's dance company and Brian's Academy of dance in Mumbai that led to her earning several awards and accolades dancing competitively.

In 2012, she featured in Disney television series, The Suite Life of Karan & Kabir (Indian adaptation of the American show The Suite Life of Zack & Cody) portraying the character of Max, as one of Karan and Kabir's friend. The same year, she made her silver screen debut with Bollywood blockbuster film Rowdy Rathore, featuring actor Akshay Kumar and veteran actor Yashpal Sharma. She played Sharma's daughter in the film. Early that year, she was chosen to play the lead child actor role in national award-winning director Anant Mahadevan's Life's Good, alongside actors Jackie Shroff and Rajit Kapoor. The director was looking for three girls of similar appearance but different ages, and chose Anklesaria to play Mishti, the youngest character. In 2013 she was in the Bollywood film Raanjhanaa playing actress Sonam Kapoor's childhood followed by Bombairiya starring Radhika Apte, released in January 2019.

Anklesaria was cast as the lead child protagonist in the telefilm Terrorist Uncle, produced by Rohit Roy productions playing the daughter Minnie of veteran actor Ronit Roy and television actress Sakshi Tanwar.

Filmography

Films

Television

Commercials and print advertisements

See also
 List of Indian film actresses

References

External links
 
 Kellogs Honey Loops commercial Watch Now
 Dabur Honey commercial by Pradeep Sorcar Watch Now
 ITC Classmate Notebooks Watch Now
 Relieve and Relax 60 seconds commercial Watch Now

21st-century Indian actresses
21st-century Indian child actresses
Actresses from Mumbai
Actresses in Hindi cinema
Actresses in Hindi television
Child actresses in Hindi cinema
Living people
Year of birth missing (living people)
Ankleshwar